The Vodopadnaya (lit. "Waterfalls River", formerly: Шиненгоу Shinengou) is a river in Primorsky Krai, in the far eastern region of Russia.

It is a left tributary of the Partizanskaya.

References

Rivers of Primorsky Krai